Cherno Samba (born 10 January 1985) is a former professional footballer who played as a forward.

He represented England at every youth level up to the under-20 team, having moved to England at an early age. He earned full caps for Gambia between 2008 and 2010.

Samba began his career with Millwall before moving to Spain to join Cádiz. He spent time on loan with Malaga B before returning to England to play for Plymouth Argyle. He played on loan for Wrexham and then played Haka in Finland and Panetolikos in Greece before moving to FK Tønsberg in Norway.

Early life
Samba was born in Banjul, Gambia. His father was a goalkeeper for the Gambian national team and his family moved to Watford, England when he was six, and then to Peckham, South London and was educated at the St Joseph's Academy, Blackheath.

Club career
Samba came to prominence when as a 13-year-old, he scored 132 goals in 32 games for the St Joseph's Academy, Blackheath football team.

He started his career at Millwall. His prolific form continued, and he was allowed to talk to other clubs by Millwall – both Manchester United and Liverpool showed interest, however Millwall turned down a Liverpool offer of £2 million. In return, Millwall agreed a contract, whereby he was guaranteed three-years of football at senior team level, on him signing full school boy forms.

In the summer of 2004, he joined Spanish club Cádiz CF, and was then loaned out for season 2005–06 to Málaga CF B, and Úbeda CF. 

He returned to English football after Ian Holloway signed him for free on 31 August 2006 for Championship club Plymouth Argyle, on a two-year contract. Samba made his Football League debut on 30 September as a 74th-minute substitute for Reuben Reid at the Ricoh Arena against Coventry City, and within eight minutes he scored his first League goal in a 1–0 win for Argyle, heading in a cross from fellow replacement Hasney Aljofree.

On 29 January 2007, he joined League Two club Wrexham on loan for a month, with the option to extend to the end of the season.
 Samba returned to Plymouth on 26 February.

On 8 August 2008, Samba signed an 18-month contract with Finnish side FC Haka.

In 2009, he returned to England and went on trial with various English clubs including Norwich City and Portsmouth. He signed a two-year contract with Greek Second Division club Panetolikos in February 2010.

On 26 July 2011, he joined English Conference National side Forest Green Rovers on trial for a game against Bristol City. He however failed to earn himself a contract. He then joined another Conference club on trial, Alfreton Town.

In October 2011, he was on trial at Mansfield Town.

On 23 March 2012, Samba joined FK Tønsberg in the Norwegian Second Division.

On 20 July 2015, Samba announced his retirement from football, due to injury.

International career
Samba represented England at every youth level up to under-20 and later decided that he wanted to play for Gambia.

In August 2008, he was called up to the Gambia squad for the 2010 World Cup qualifying match against Liberia and on 6 September 2008, he made his first appearance for Gambia as he played the final minutes of the match. He scored his first goal for the Scorpions in a friendly against Tunisia on 9 January 2010 when he headed in a Sanna Nyassi cross to open the scoring. The goal was made all the more special for Samba as it came on the eve of his 25th birthday. His last international appearance was against Mexico in June 2010. Samba was named in Gambia's squad for the 2012 Africa Cup of Nations qualifiers, but chose not to participate.

International goal

Personal life
In 2018 he spoke out about his mental health, disclosing that he had suffered as a young player from depression, and had attempted to take his own life whilst playing in Spain.

The Gambia football school, "Cherno Samba Academy of Football", from the Academy was coupled out the professional team Samger FC, is named after him.

In popular culture
Samba was well known among players of computer game Championship Manager, due to the fact that he became an incredibly good player further down the line in the game, despite his relatively cheap price tag; this turned him into something of a cult hero amongst fans of the game. Although he confessed to never playing Championship Manager, he revealed that his mobile phone provider once cut the delivery time from 2–3 months to next-day delivery on learning that he was serving Samba.

References

External links
 
 
 

1985 births
Living people
Sportspeople from Banjul
Gambian footballers
English footballers
Association football forwards
Millwall F.C. players
Cádiz CF players
Atlético Malagueño players
Málaga CF players
Plymouth Argyle F.C. players
Wrexham A.F.C. players
FC Haka players
Panetolikos F.C. players
FK Tønsberg players
English Football League players
Veikkausliiga players
Gambian emigrants to England
Black British sportsmen
People educated at St Joseph's Academy, Blackheath
England youth international footballers
The Gambia international footballers
English expatriate footballers
Gambian expatriate footballers
Expatriate footballers in Finland
Expatriate footballers in Greece
Expatriate footballers in Norway
Expatriate footballers in Spain
English expatriate sportspeople in Finland
English expatriate sportspeople in Greece
English expatriate sportspeople in Norway
English expatriate sportspeople in Spain
Gambian expatriate sportspeople in Norway
Gambian expatriate sportspeople in Spain
People from Watford
Footballers from Peckham